Brooke Burfitt  (born 23 December 1988) is an English actress and radio presenter.

Early years and family 
Brooke Burfitt is the daughter of Louise Burfitt-Dons who set up the children’s anti-bullying charity Act Against Bullying and Donald, a retired Qantas captain. She has an Economics and Business with East European Studies degree from University College London. She currently lives in Bermuda with her husband and daughter.

Career 
Burfitt appeared in On The Ropes, as Joe Egan's girlfriend in a mockumentary about a behind the scenes look at the boxing world. In Death she was directed by Martin Gooch which won at the Feel Good Film Festival in 2012. She has also featured in the comedy Pulp and the movie Soft Touch.

In 2014, Brooke worked with actor and film maker Stuart Brennan on a zombie apocalypse feature film 'Plan Z' as supporting lead role, Irish girl Kate. The film went on to win Best Thriller at the National Film Awards UK

Brooke Burfitt stars as the lead role in independent feature "By Any Means (2017 film)" as "Mimi Wyatt". Radar Online says the film's storyline channels Kim Kardashian's paris robbery in 2016. Burfitt won Best Actress award at the Wexford Film Festival, where the film also went on to win Best Film. By Any Means (2017 film) won Best International Feature Film at the 2017 Polish International Film Festival.

"By Any Means (2017 film)" was the subject of some controversy after convicted kidnapper Lukasz Herba stated in the closing statement of his trial that he was inspired after watching the movie. Herba, a UK resident from Poland, was sentenced to almost 17 years in jail for his role in the abduction of Chloe Ayling in Milan in July 2017, eight weeks after the release of the film.

At the start of 2017, Brooke starred alongside Kelly McGillis and Kate Mansi in female-led thriller "Mother Of All Secrets", which was entirely filmed in Bermuda. The movie premiered on Lifetime (TV network) over Mother's Day weekend in March 2020.

Burfitt plays the lead Blair Henderson in festive romantic comedy Television film "Christmas at the Castle", which premiered on December 23 on Lifetime (TV network). She stars alongside Dan Jeannotte, Nicholas Farrell, Geraldine Somerville and Caprice Bourret. The film is also released worldwide by Reel One Entertainment under the alternative title of "Christmas in the Highlands".

On January 8, 2022, "Labor, Lies and Murder" aired as an exclusive premiere for Lifetime (TV network). Brooke plays eight month pregnant Hailey, who fears someone is out to steal her baby. Burfitt could be seen over the 2022 Christmas holidays on Great American Family premiere movie "Christmas Lovers Anonymous" as Katrina, a best-selling author who hides her love for Christmas after an ugly break up. Katrina finds love again when she joins a website for people who are crazy about Christmas: "Christmas Lovers Anonymous."

Filmography

References

External links
 

Alumni of University College London
English radio personalities
Living people
1988 births
21st-century English actresses
English film actresses